The 2015 Olivet Comets football team, sometimes known as Team 115 in reference to the 115th season the Olivet football program had fielded a team, was an American football team that represented Olivet College during the 2015 NCAA Division III football season. The Comets play in the MIAA and played their home games at the Cutler Athletic Complex in Olivet, Michigan. Olivet was led by Dan Pifer, who was in his fourth season.

Season synopsis

The Comets won a share of the MIAA conference title for the first time since 2007 and for the eleventh time in school history. The nine wins in the season set a new single season record.

Broadcasting

For another season, broadcasting for the Comets was done by 89.1 The One WOCR FM with play-by-play done by station manager Travis Oberlin and color analysis by Daniel Neugent. The games could be heard on the radio and on wocrfm.com.

Schedule

References

Olivet
Olivet Comets football seasons
Olivet Comets football